Big Stone County is a county in the U.S. state of Minnesota. As of the 2020 census, the population was 5,166. Its county seat is Ortonville.

History
The county was formed in 1862, and was organized in 1874.

Geography
Big Stone County lies on the western side of Minnesota. Its southwest boundary line abuts the east boundary line of the state of South Dakota. The Little Minnesota River flows along the county's southwestern boundary. Since 1937, a dam (Big Stone Lake Dam) has impounded the river's waters, creating Big Stone Lake. Water flowing out from this lake flows along the south boundary line of the county, and is known as the Minnesota River from that point. Fish Creek flows southwesterly through the northwestern part of the county, discharging into Big Stone Lake at the county's southwestern boundary.

The terrain of Big Stone County is low rolling hills, wooded or devoted to agriculture. The terrain generally slopes to the south and east, although its southwestern portion slopes to the river valley. Its highest point is on its north line near the northwestern corner, 2.9 miles (4.6 km) east of Lagoona Beach, at 1,201' (366m) ASL.

Lakes

 Artichoke Lake - south edge in Akron Township, vast majority in Artichoke Township
 Barry Lake - Toqua Township
 Bentsen Lake - east half in Otrey Township, west half in Big Stone Township
 Big Stone Lake - Ortonville Township, Browns Valley Township, Foster Township, Prior Township, Big Stone Township
 Clear Lake - Toqua Township
 Cup Lake - Almond Township
 Deep Lake - Big Stone Township
 East Toqua Lake - Graceville Township
 Eli Lake - south three-quarters in Almond Township, west quarter in Clinton
 Fogarty Lake - Toqua Township
 Horseshoe Lake - Odessa Township
 Lannon Lake - Graceville Township
 Lindgren Lake - Ortonville Township
 Lake Leo - Graceville Township
 Lone Tree Lake - east three-quarters in Malta Township, west quarter in Almond Township
 Long Lake - Artichoke Township
 Long Tom Lake - northeast edge in Otrey Township, vast majority in Odessa Township
 Lysing Lake - vast majority in Almond Township, south edge in Big Stone Township
 Marsh Lake - Akron Township
 Moonshine Lake - Moonshine Township
 Moulton Lake - Big Stone Township
 Mundweiler Lake - Big Stone Township
 Munnwyler Lake - Ortonville Township
 Olson Lake - Big Stone Township
 Olson Lake - Otrey Township
 Otrey Lake - Otrey Township
 Peterson Lake - Odessa Township
 South Rothwell Lake - north edge in Graceville Township, vast majority in Almond Township
 Smithwicks Lake - Graceville Township
 Swenson Lake - Big Stone Township
 Twin Lakes - Big Stone Township
 West Toqua Lake - Graceville Township
 Walter Lake - Ortonville Township

Source: United States Census Bureau 2007 TIGER/Line Shapefiles

Major highways

  U.S. Highway 12
  U.S. Highway 75
  Minnesota State Highway 7
  Minnesota State Highway 28

Adjacent counties

 Traverse County - north
 Stevens County - northeast
 Swift County - southeast
 Lac qui Parle County - south
 Grant County, South Dakota - southwest
 Roberts County, South Dakota - northwest

Protected areas

 Big Stone Lake State Park
 Big Stone National Wildlife Refuge (part)
 Big Stone Wildlife Management Preserve (part)
 Clinton Prairie Scientific and Nature Area
 Dismal Swamp State Wildlife Management Area
 Freed State Wildlife Management Area
 Lac qui Parle State Wildlife Management Area
 Otrey State Wildlife Management Area
 Reisdorph State Wildlife Management Area
 Victor State Wildlife Management Area

Climate and weather

Demographics

2000 Census
As of the 2000 census, there were 5,820 people, 2,377 households, and 1,611 families in the county. The population density was 11.7/sqmi (4.50/km2). There were 3,171 housing units at an average density of 6.35/sqmi (2.45/km2). The racial makeup of the county was 98.44% White, 0.17% Black or African American, 0.52% Native American, 0.41% Asian, 0.12% from other races, and 0.34% from two or more races. 0.34% of the population were Hispanic or Latino of any race. 45.7% were of German, 21.0% Norwegian, 8.0% Swedish and 6.3% Irish ancestry.

There were 2,377 households, out of which 29.00% had children under the age of 18 living with them, 59.60% were married couples living together, 5.30% had a female householder with no husband present, and 32.20% were non-families. 30.20% of all households were made up of individuals, and 16.90% had someone living alone who was 65 years of age or older. The average household size was 2.38 and the average family size was 2.97.

The county population contained 24.80% under the age of 18, 5.30% from 18 to 24, 21.90% from 25 to 44, 24.00% from 45 to 64, and 24.00% who were 65 years of age or older. The median age was 44 years. For every 100 females there were 94.30 males. For every 100 females age 18 and over, there were 91.10 males.

The median income for a household in the county was $30,721, and the median income for a family was $37,354. Males had a median income of $27,857 versus $20,123 for females. The per capita income for the county was $15,708. About 7.80% of families and 12.00% of the population were below the poverty line, including 14.50% of those under age 18 and 8.80% of those age 65 or over.

2020 Census

Communities

Cities

 Barry
 Beardsley
 Clinton
 Correll
 Graceville
 Johnson
 Odessa
 Ortonville

Unincorporated communities

 Artichoke
 Big Stone Colony
 Bonanza Grove
 Foster
 Lagoona Beach
 Yankeetown

Townships

 Akron Township
 Almond Township
 Artichoke Township
 Big Stone Township
 Browns Valley Township
 Foster Township
 Graceville Township
 Malta Township
 Moonshine Township
 Odessa Township
 Ortonville Township
 Otrey Township
 Prior Township
 Toqua Township

Government and politics
Big Stone County voters have tended to vote down the middle for several decades. In recent elections the vote has been more Republican than Democratic. In 2016 Donald Trump expanded the thin margin Mitt Romney won the county by in 2012 as Democratic candidate Hillary Clinton registered only 33% of the vote to Trump's 58%.

See also
 National Register of Historic Places listings in Big Stone County, Minnesota

References

External links
 Big Stone County website

 
Minnesota counties
1874 establishments in Minnesota
Populated places established in 1874